Soricomys, the shrew-mice, are a genus of rodents in the family Muridae. They are carnivores that feed on invertebrates much like shrews do. An apparently smaller relatives of the true shrew-rats Chrotomys and Rhynchomys, Soricomys are somewhat convergent to the more distantly related Crunomys.

The species are:
 Soricomys kalinga
 Co's shrew mouse, Soricomys leonardocoi
 Southern Cordillera shrew mouse, Soricomys montanus
 Sierra Madre shrew mouse, Soricomys musseri

S. kalinga was only discovered on March 30, 2000, and described in 2006.

References

  (2006): A new species of the shrew-mouse, Archboldomys (Rodentia: Muridae: Murinae), from the Philippines. Systematics and Biodiversity 4(4): 489–501.  (HTML abstract)
  (2005): Superfamily Muroidea. In: : Mammal Species of the World: A Taxonomic and Geographic Reference: 894–1531. Johns Hopkins University Press, Baltimore.
  (1982): Results of the Archbold Expeditions. No. 110. Crunomys and the small-bodied shrew rats native to the Philippine Islands and Sulawesi (Celebes). Bulletin of the American Museum of Natural History 174(1): 1-95.

 
Rodents of the Philippines
Rodent genera

Endemic fauna of the Philippines